Alan Roura is a Swiss professional sailor, born on 26 February 1993 in Onex (Switzerland). At the age of 23, in the 2016–2017 Vendée Globe, he is the youngest competitor in the history of the event, of which he finished 12th. In 2019, on La Fabrique, the second Imoca of the name, he set a solo crossing of the North Atlantic on a 60-foot monohull crossing in a record time of 7 days, 16 hours, 58 minutes and 25 seconds. After 95 days at sea, he finished 17th in the 2020-2021 Vendée Globe. In October 2021, Alan Roura and his sponsors announced the purchase of a new IMOCA 60 for the Vendée Globe 2024: The ex hugo boss, a 2019 VPLP-Design previously owned by the british skipper Alex Thomson.

Results

References

External links
 Vendee Campaign Website 

1993 births
Living people
Sportspeople from Saint-Malo
Swiss male sailors (sport)
Class 40 class sailors
IMOCA 60 class sailors
Swiss Vendee Globe sailors
2016 Vendee Globe sailors
2020 Vendee Globe sailors
Vendée Globe finishers
Single-handed circumnavigating sailors